Kraainem (sometimes unofficially spelt Crainhem in French) is a municipality in the province of Flemish Brabant, in Flanders, one of the three regions of Belgium. The municipality only comprises the town of Kraainem proper. On January 1, 2006, Kraainem had a total population of 13,150. The total area is 5.80 km² which gives a population density of 2,266 inhabitants per km².

Kraainem is a municipality with language facilities within Flanders, where the sole official language is Dutch. However, in 1963, special 'language facilities' were given to French-speaking inhabitants, when those were still a minority. They can request official documents from the local administration in French. Today, a majority of the inhabitants are French-speaking.

Kraainem is one of the most affluent municipalities in Belgium.

Urbanisation 
The forest of Stokkel belonged to the d'Huart family until the 1920s. When grandfather d'Huart died in 1927, his family decided to found "la Société Immobilière de Stockel" and built a lane through the forest. This lane is the current Albert d'Huartlaan that used to be covered with gravel until 1960. 

The homes surrounding the "Hurlevent" were built and afterwards those of the society of Utrecht. The real construction started in 1930 and accelerated after the second world war. Approximately 2800 people lived in Kraainem in 1940, 3254 in 1945 and 5190 in 1954, which was the year in which urbanisation really experienced its surge.

In 1949 the social housing of Eigen Haard were built followed by the Josephine Charlotte neighbourhood in 1954. Over 11,000 persons lived in the Kraainem region in 1967. In 1993, of a total population of 12,780 residents, 2,623 were immigrants. Despite being located in Flanders, Kraainem became increasingly francophone during the 20th century, reducing the Dutch-speakers to a minority. Communal politics is centred upon the language issue. Given the commune's proximity and good transport links to the airport, to NATO and to the European Quarter, an increasing number of non-Belgians have settled in the municipality and this trend looks set to continue as the few remaining greenfield sites are developed.

The commune has two state schools, one Dutch and one francophone, and in 1968 the new St-Dominicus chapel was inaugurated.

Tourism 
Its rich industrial and cultural legacy, in addition to its favorable location next to Brussels and the Zaventem Airport, have enabled Kraainem to develop its position as a touristic destination in recent years. The 8th century St. Pancras Church, the 20th century Bouvier-Washer Cité and its Salesian monastery are popular attractions for tourists. A lack of local lodging infrastructure has slowed touristic development until the early 2000s, when guest houses and AirBnB resolved this shortcoming.

References

External links
 
 
Official website (in Dutch and French)

 
Municipalities of Flemish Brabant